The Contemporary Art Centre of South Australia (CACSA), formerly Contemporary Art Society (CAS), was an art museum and art space located in the Adelaide suburb of Parkside, in South Australia. In late 2016 it merged with the Australian Experimental Art Foundation to form ACE Open.

The quarterly art journal Broadsheet was published by the CAS from 1954. This became Broadsheet: A Journal of Contemporary Art when the organisation changed its name and constitution in 1986, and later changed again to Contemporary Visual Arts and Culture: Broadsheet and, from 2007, Contemporary Visual Art + Culture: Broadsheet. ACE Open continued to publish the journal until September 2017.

History
A network of independent organisations across Australia each known as Contemporary Art Society were created following the founding of the Contemporary Art Society of Victoria in July 1938.
CACSA was the third of these, established in 1942 as the Contemporary Art Society as a breakaway from the Royal Society of Arts. It was run by volunteers, with Max Harris as president and secretary, and Ivor Francis as vice-president. Dorrit Black was an active member of the society until her death in 1951.

First known as the Adelaide branch of the Contemporary Art Society, its first exhibition was held in the South Australian Society of Arts gallery in October 1943, though an anti-Fascist exhibition had been held in Adelaide by the older branches (Victoria and New South Wales) in January that year. 

In 1964 the Contemporary Art Society moved into a bluestone residence in Porter Street, Parkside, which was used for exhibiting its members' work, which, by the time of its closure in 2016, had become the longest-running contemporary art space in the country.

In 1974, a new organisation named the Australian Experimental Art Foundation (AEAF) was created by members breaking away from CACSA, with the intention of focusing on "more radical, multi-disciplinary and performance work". 

In 1986 the organisation became incorporated, was renamed the Contemporary Art Centre of South Australia, and became a publicly-funded organisation which ran nationally and internationally significant exhibitions. It was one of Australia's most prominent contemporary art organisations, with its mission to "promote, develop and support contemporary art practice and critical thinking through South Australian, national and international exhibitions, publications, debate and associated activities".

CACSA became a member of Contemporary Art Organisations of Australia (CAOs), established in 1995 and still in existence  with the changed abbreviation (now abbreviated as CAOA). The network of "public, independent, non-collecting contemporary art organisations" from around Australia is an advocacy body for Australian small to medium contemporary visual arts bodies, helping to promote the work of living artists.

From August 2016 CACSA started talks to merge with the Australian Experimental Art Foundation (AEAF) after two rounds of severe funding cuts to the Australia Council in the federal government budgets of 2014/15 and 2015/16.  Arts SA provided funding for the two organisations to cover operational costs for 2017, which enabled planning for the merger, which was named ACE Open. Liz Nowell, former CEO of CACSA, became CEO of the new organisation.

Publications
The CAS  published the quarterly art journal known as Broadsheet from 1954. This was continued by CACSA from 1986, variously titled Broadsheet: A Journal of Contemporary Art, Broadsheet: Contemporary Visual Arts and Culture; Contemporary Visual Arts and Culture: Broadsheet, and, from 2007, Contemporary Visual Art + Culture Broadsheet (abbreviated to CVA+C Broadsheet).

Exhibitions
CACSA undertook regular large scale survey and multi-sited surveys of contemporary South Australian art as part of the CACSA Contemporary series, including CACSA Contemporary 2010: THE NEW NEW, CACSA CONTEMPORARY 2012: NEW SA ART + IBIDEM: PUBLIC ART PROJECT and CACSA Contemporary 2015. CASCA also provided a space to predominantly emerging and experimental arts practice as part of the Project Space exhibition program.

References

1942 establishments in Australia
Art museums established in 1942
Arts in Adelaide